Toney may refer to:

People
Toney (name)

Places
Toney, Alabama, United States
Toney, West Virginia, United States
Toney, County Fermanagh, townland in County Fermanagh, Northern Ireland
Toney Fork, West Virginia, United States
Toney Stratford, former name of Stratford Tony village and parish, Wiltshire, England
Toney Mountain, Antarctica
Toney River, Nova Scotia, Canada

See also

Black Toney, a Thoroughbred horse
Saham Toney
Toney-Standley House
Taney (disambiguation)
Tony (disambiguation)
Tone (disambiguation)
Toner (surname)
Tonny (disambiguation)
Tovey (disambiguation)